Thomas Elliott (born 21 August 1867, date of death unknown) was a New Zealand cricketer. He played twelve first-class matches for Auckland between 1894 and 1906.

See also
 List of Auckland representative cricketers

References

External links
 

1867 births
Year of death missing
New Zealand cricketers
Auckland cricketers
Cricketers from Auckland